Brazil competed at the 2012 Winter Youth Olympics in Innsbruck, Austria. The Brazilian team was made up of two athlete, both in alpine skiing.

Brazil had originally qualified a mixed curling team, however the quota spots were rejected.

Alpine skiing

Brazil qualified one boy and one girl in alpine skiing.

Boy

Girl

See also
Brazil at the 2012 Summer Olympics

References

Nations at the 2012 Winter Youth Olympics
Winter Youth Olympics
Brazil at the Youth Olympics